The national flag of Guatemala, often referred to as "Pabellón Nacional" (literally, "National Flag") or "Azul y Blanco" ("Blue and White") features two colors: Sky blue and white. The two Sky blue  stripes represent the fact that Guatemala is a land located between two oceans, the Pacific Ocean and the Atlantic Ocean (Caribbean sea); and the sky over the country (see Guatemala's national anthem). The white signifies peace and purity. The blue and white colors, like those of several other countries in the region, are based on the flag of the former Federal Republic of Central America.

In the center of the flag is the Guatemalan coat of arms.  It includes the resplendent quetzal, the national bird of Guatemala that symbolizes liberty; a parchment scroll bearing the date of Central America's independence from Spain, 15 September 1821; crossed  Remington  rifles, indicating Guatemala's willingness to defend itself by force if need be; a bay laurel crown, the symbol for victory; and crossed swords, representing honor. It is one of four national flags among UN member states that features a firearm, along with those of Mozambique, Haiti and Bolivia.

It is one of five national flags that use the ratio 5:8, with the others being Argentina, Palau, Poland, and Sweden.

History 

The  Federal Republic of Central America flag was used in Guatemala until 1851, when a pro-Spanish faction took over and added the Spanish colors of red and yellow to the flag. The original colors were restored on 17 August 1871, but as vertical (rather than horizontal) stripes in order to distinguish it from other flags and with a new coat of arms.

The resplendent quetzal previously appeared in the 1830s in the flag of Los Altos, the sixth state in the Federal Republic.

In 2008 a flag called the Bandera de Los Pueblos (Flag of indigenous peoples) was adopted by law and is shown together with the national flag of Guatemala in all events featuring the President of Guatemala since then. The flag is divided in four parts, red, yellow, white and black, each colour representing Xinca people, Garifuna people, Maya people, and Ladino people, respectively.

These colours are also part of the Qanil, a Maya symbol in which each color represents a point of the compass, an element of nature and a part of the human being. Qanil means "seed" in Mayan languages, and is also one of the 20 days of the Maya calendar.
Aimed at promoting "interculturality" in Guatemala, the Bandera de los Pueblos was received with disinterest by the leaders of the peoples, who do not seem to have been consulted.

Ethnic group flags

Government flags

Military flags

Political flags

Department flags

Historical flags
The Guatemalan flag has changed throughout history, arriving to its current design in 1871.

References 

1871 introductions
National symbols of Guatemala
Guatemala
Flags displaying animals